Laio Azeredo dos Santos (born 2 May 1989), simply knowns as Laio or Layo, is a Brazilian footballer, who plays as a center forward for Itapemirim.

Career

Early career
Laio spent most of his early years playing in his native Brazil. During the 2009 Série A season, he managed to score two times in eight appearances for Botafogo.

Gloria Bistrița
In the summer of 2012, he agreed to join the Romanian team Gloria Bistrița. He made his debut in a match against Astra Ploiești which concluded in a defeat. He scored his first goal in an official match at Gloria Bistrița in a draw against Petrolul Ploiești. He entered the field, then his first touch was a goal.

References

External links

1989 births
Living people
Brazilian footballers
Botafogo de Futebol e Regatas players
Macaé Esporte Futebol Clube players
Democrata Futebol Clube players
Duque de Caxias Futebol Clube players
ACF Gloria Bistrița players
Liga I players
Association football forwards
Brazilian expatriate footballers
Expatriate footballers in Romania
Brazilian expatriate sportspeople in Romania
People from Campos dos Goytacazes
Sportspeople from Rio de Janeiro (state)